Alexandros Michail (born 28 january 2000) is a cypriot footballer].

References

1974 births
Living people
Cypriot footballers
Apollon Limassol FC players
AEP Paphos FC players
Nikos & Sokratis Erimis FC players
Association football goalkeepers
Cypriot First Division players
Cyprus international footballers